"Honky Tonk Blues" was a hit country and western song written and performed by Hank Williams. The original 1952 recording was a major hit, and it later became a hit for later-day superstar Charley Pride.

Hank Williams version
"Honky Tonk Blues" is one of the most problematic songs Williams ever recorded.  According to Colin Escott's 2004 Williams memoir, Hank and producer Fred Rose had attempted to record the song several times previously: in August 1947 (the session that produced the novelty "Fly Trouble"); in March 1949 (this version featured a light, jazzy feel and an intricate solo from guitarist Zeb Turner, but Hank broke meter and it was abandoned); and again in June 1950.  The backing on the December 1951 session is believed to have been Don Helms (steel guitar), Jerry Rivers (fiddle), possibly Sam Pruett (electric guitar), probably Jack Shook (acoustic guitar), and Ernie Newton or Howard Watts (bass).  The song was about a young farmboy who leaves his father's farm for the enticements of the city, only to become worn down and disillusioned.  The version that was released did not contain all the lyrics on his original demo; the next-to-last verse in which Maw and Paw are "really gonna lay down the law" was missing, emphasizing in a way that Hank himself never made it back from the honky-tonks to pappy's farm.  Williams' version reached No. 2 on the Billboard magazine country best-sellers chart.

The title served as the name for a documentary about Williams broadcast by PBS as part of its American Masters series. The documentary was also shown at the 48th London Film Festival in 2004.

Chart performance

Cover versions
Hank Williams Jr. recorded the song as an overdubbed duet with his father in 1965 for MGM and then again in 1996 with his own son Hank III on the album Three Hanks: Men with Broken Hearts.
It appears on the Nitty Gritty Dirt Band's 1972 album Will the Circle Be Unbroken.
The most successful cover version was by Charley Pride; his version reached the top of the Billboard magazine Hot Country Singles chart in April 1980.
Waylon Jennings included a version of the song on his 1982 album Black on Black.
Huey Lewis and the News covered the song on their 1983 album Sports.
The song was also recorded as the debut single by American country music group Pirates of the Mississippi.  Released in 1990, it was the first single from the album Pirates of the Mississippi.  The song reached number 26 on the Billboard Hot Country Singles & Tracks chart.
Jason and the Scorchers covered the song.
Roy Gaines recorded the song on his 1999 album I Got the T-Bone Walker Blues.
The Kentucky Headhunters recorded the song for their 2005 LP Big Boss Man.
Don Williams recorded the song for Pulse in 1999.
Dion DiMucci covered "Honky Tonk Blues" on his 2007 album, Bronx in Blue.
Richard & Linda Thompson recorded a live version on the 2010 deluxe edition of Shoot Out the Lights.
Lacy J. Dalton recorded the song for her 2010 album, Here's to Hank.

Charley Pride version

Weekly charts

Year-end charts

Pirates of the Mississippi version

Chart performance

References

Bibliography
 

1952 songs
1980 singles
1990 debut singles
Hank Williams songs
Charley Pride songs
Pirates of the Mississippi songs
Songs written by Hank Williams
Song recordings produced by James Stroud
RCA Records singles
Capitol Records Nashville singles
Song recordings produced by Fred Rose (songwriter)